Idrone East is a barony in County Carlow, Republic of Ireland. The early barony of Idrone was split into East and West in 1799.

Etymology
Idrone takes its name from the ancient name for the tuath, first recorded c. 1100 as Hua Drona in the Latin Vitae sanctorum Hiberniae. The Martyrology of Oengus the Culdee (c. 1150) calls it Huib Dróna in Middle Irish. The ruling family claimed descent from Drona, fourth son of Cathair Mór, a legendary 2nd century AD king.

Location

Idrone East is found in the central part of County Carlow, east of the River Barrow.

Forth barony is bordered to the south by St. Mullin's Lower; to the east by Forth; to the west by Idrone West; to the north by Carlow (all the preceding baronies are also in County Carlow); to the southwest by Gowran, County Kilkenny; and to the southeast by Scarawalsh and Bantry, County Wexford.

History
The Uí Bairrche and Ui Drona are cited early here. The O'Riain (Ryan) sept were Lords of Idrone. The Ó Dubhghaill (O'Doyle) clan of Viking origin was said to originate from a 9th-century King of Idrone.

List of settlements

Below is a list of settlements in Idrone East barony:
Ballinkillin
Borris
Leighlinbridge (eastern part)
Nurney
Muine Bheag

References

Baronies of County Carlow